Miss Brazil World 2011 was the 22nd edition of the Miss Brazil World pageant and 6th under MMB Productions & Events. The contest took place on August 13, 2011. Each state, the Federal District and various Insular Regions competed for the title. Kamilla Salgado of Pará crowned Juceila Bueno of Rio Grande do Sul at the end of the contest. Bueno represented Brazil at Miss World 2011. The contest was held at the Hotel do Frade in Angra dos Reis, Rio de Janeiro, Brazil.

Results

Regional Queens of Beauty

Special Awards

Challenge Events

Beauty with a Purpose

Beach Beauty Brazil

Best Model Brazil

Miss Creativity

Miss Popularity UOL

Miss Sportswoman Brazil

Miss Talent

Delegates
The delegates for Miss Brazil World 2011 were:

States

 - Thaís Lianne
 - Daniella Borçato
 - Josilene Modesto
 - Renata Reis Mendes
 - Paloma Vega
 - Beatriz Sousa
 - Kellin Schmidt
 - Rhaíssa Siviero
 - Evellyn Barbosa
 - Nataly Uchôa
 - Mariana Albuquerque
 - Thaiany Bittencourt
 - Juliane Késsia
 - Priscila Winny
 - Benazira Djoco
 - Adrielly Barron
 - Luzielle Vasconcelos
 - Kahuany Tufaile
 - Stefanie Figueiredo
 - Késsia Cortez
 - Juceila Bueno
 - Mariana Bathke
 - Ana Cecília Cunha
 - Mariane Silvestre
 - Camila Serakides

Insular Regions

 Abrolhos - Juliana Nascimento
 Fernando de Noronha - Mayra Albuquerque
 Florianópolis Islands - Sophia Scarlett
 Ilha da Pintada - Vanessa Koetz
 Ilha do Marajó - Aline Reis
 Ilha de Porto Belo - Dionara Lermen
 Ilha de Vitória - Mariana Lopes
 Ilha dos Lobos - Andressa Mello
 Ilha dos Marinheiros - Paula Helwanger

Notes

Did not compete

References

External links
 Official site (in Portuguese)

2011
2011 in Brazil
2011 beauty pageants